Erythrolamprus vitti is a species of snake in the family Colubridae. The species is found in Ecuador and Colombia.

References

Erythrolamprus
Reptiles of Ecuador
Reptiles of Colombia
Reptiles described in 2000
Taxa named by James R. Dixon